Kultaranta VIII is the presidential yacht of the Finnish President. It replaced the previous yacht, Kultaranta VII, in 2008. It is named after "Kultaranta", the President's summer residence. 

The yacht was built by the Finnish shipbuilding company Uki Workboat in Uusikaupunki. Its hull is of aluminum, and the interior uses a lot of wood. It is powered by four   Volvo Penta engines.

Laid down in 2007, the yacht was completed at a cost of around 1.9 million euro, and handed over on 16 May 2008. It is crewed by members of the Finnish Navy, and is ported at the Naval Base at Pansio when not in use.

References

2008 ships
Ships of Finland
Ships built in Finland
Royal and presidential yachts